Joshua tree is a common name of Yucca brevifolia, a species of arborescent monocot native to North America. 

Joshua Tree may also refer to:

Placenames
Joshua Tree, California, a census-designated place in San Bernardino County, California,  United States
Roy Williams Airport or Joshua Tree Airport
Joshua Tree National Park, in California
Joshua Tree Forest, a landmark on the Mojave Road
Joshua Tree Forest Parkway, a segment of U.S. Route 93 in Arizona

Creative works
The Joshua Tree, a 1987 album by U2
The Joshua Tree Tour, a 1987 tour by U2
The Joshua Tree Tours 2017 and 2019, 2017 and 2019 concert tours by U2
Joshua Tree (1993 film), a film starring Dolph Lundgren
Joshua Tree  (2002 film), a short film by Jonathan Messer
"Joshua Tree", a 2002 short story by Emma Bull

Other
Joshua Tree (horse), an Irish racehorse